Straw is an unincorporated community located in Edmonson County, Kentucky, United States.

References

Unincorporated communities in Edmonson County, Kentucky
Unincorporated communities in Kentucky